Boonea is a small genus of small sea snails, pyramidellid gastropod mollusks.

This genus is currently placed in the subfamily Odostomiinae, of the family Pyramidellidae (according to the taxonomy of Bouchet & Rocroi (2005)).

Distribution
The vast majority of the species within this genus are only known to be distributed within North American waters, Hudson Bay is a very populated location for the Boonea genus.

Life habits
Little is known about the biology of the members of this genus. As most members of the Pyramidellidae sensu lato they are most likely  ectoparasites.

The species Boonea impressa however is known to be a severe pest of the edible oyster Crassostrea virginica (Wilson, Powell & Ray, 1988)

Species
There are eleven known species within the genus Boonea, these include the following:
 Boonea bisuturalis (Say, 1822)
 Boonea cincta (Carpenter, 1864)
 Boonea impressa (Say, 1822)
 Boonea jadisi (Olsson & McGinty, 1958)
 Boonea kinpana Hori & Nakamura, 1999
 Boonea okamurai Hori & Okutani, 1996
 Boonea scymnocelata Pimenta, Absalão & Miyaji, 2009
 Boonea seminuda (C. B. Adams, 1839) - type species, as Jaminia seminuda
 Boonea somersi (Verrill & Bush, 1900)
 Boonea suoana Hori & Nakamura, 1999
 Boonea umboniocola Hori and Okutani, 1995

References

Further reading 
 
 

Pyramidellidae